Johnson Creek is a  long 2nd order tributary to the Ararat River in Surry County, North Carolina.

Variant names
According to the Geographic Names Information System, it has also been known historically as:
Johnstons Creek

Course
Johnson Creek rises on the Grassy Creek divide at Orchard Gap in Carroll County, Virginia.  Johnson Creek then flows south-southeast into Patrick County, Virginia and continues to Surry County, North Carolina to join the Ararat River about 0.1 miles southwest of Sulphur Springs.

Watershed
Johnson Creek drains  of area, receives about 50.0 in/year of precipitation, has a wetness index of 305.34, and is about 71% forested.

See also
List of rivers of North Carolina

References

Rivers of North Carolina
Rivers of Virginia
Rivers of Carroll County, Virginia
Rivers of Patrick County, Virginia
Rivers of Surry County, North Carolina